WASL may refer to:

WASL (FM), a radio station (100.1 FM) licensed to Dyersburg, Tennessee, United States
WASL (gene), a human gene called Wiskott-Aldrich syndrome-like
Washington Assessment of Student Learning
Western Australian Super League, an ice hockey league

See also 
 Al Wasl (disambiguation)
 Wasl, a village in Yemen